Hu Yunhao  (born 27 June 1989), also known as Harry, is a Chinese actor.

Career

Film

Television series

Discography

Awards and nominations

References

1989 births
Living people
Male actors from Beijing
Tongji University alumni
Shanghai Theatre Academy alumni
21st-century Chinese male actors
Chinese male television actors